Yunyoo is one of the constituencies represented in the Parliament of Ghana. It elects one Member of Parliament (MP) by the first past the post system of election. Yunyoo is located in the Bunkpurugu-Yunyoo district  of the North East Region of Ghana.

Boundaries
The seat is located between the Bunkpurugu Nakpanduri, Cheriponi and East Mamprusi District of the North East  Region of Ghana.

Members of Parliament

See also
 List of Ghana Parliament constituencies

References 

Parliamentary constituencies in the North East Region (Ghana)